The Wombles are fictional creatures created by Elisabeth Beresford and originally appearing in a series of children's novels.

Womble may also refer to:

 The Wombles (1973 TV series), a stop motion series featuring the fictional creatures 
 The Wombles (1996 TV series), an animated children series featuring the fictional creatures 
 The Wombles (band), British pop group spinoff from the TV series
 Womble (surname)
 Wimbledon F.C., a now defunct English football club, nicknamed The Wombles
 AFC Wimbledon, an English football club 
 Ulster Defence Association, an Ulster loyalist paramilitary group in Northern Ireland
 WOMBLES, an anarchist group
 A type of Soviet NBC suit, because of its long faced respirator with round visor glasses

See also
 Wombling, a statistical technique for identifying zones of abrupt change